André Künzi (born January 10, 1967) is a former Swiss ice hockey player who played for SC Bern , EV Zug and HC Ambrí Piotta in the National League A. He also played for the Switzerland men's national ice hockey team at the 1988 and 1992 Olympics as well as at the 1986 and 1987 World Junior Ice Hockey Championships.

External links

André Künzi statistics at sports-reference.com

1967 births
Swiss ice hockey defencemen
Olympic ice hockey players of Switzerland
Living people
Ice hockey players at the 1988 Winter Olympics
Ice hockey players at the 1992 Winter Olympics
EV Zug players
SC Bern players
People from Bern-Mittelland District
Sportspeople from the canton of Bern